Anna the Adventuress is a 1920 British silent drama film directed by Cecil Hepworth and starring Alma Taylor, Jean Cadell and James Carew. It is based on a novel by Phillips Oppenheim. Made by Hepworth Pictures at Walton Studios, it is now considered a lost film.

Plot summary
Two identical sisters are able to switch places, leading to a series of unfortunate incidents.

Cast
 Alma Taylor as Anna / Annabel Pelissier 
 Jean Cadell as Nellie Bates 
 James Carew as Montagu Hill 
 Gerald Ames as Nigel Ennison 
 Gwynne Herbert as Aunt 
 Christine Rayner as Mrs. Ellicote 
 Ronald Colman as Brendan 
 James Annand as Sir John Ferringhall

See also
List of lost films

References

External links
 

1920 films
1920 drama films
British silent feature films
Films directed by Cecil Hepworth
Lost British films
British drama films
British black-and-white films
Hepworth Pictures films
Films shot at Nettlefold Studios
Lost drama films
1920 lost films
Films based on British novels
1920s English-language films
1920s British films
Silent drama films